Alisa Weilerstein (born April 14, 1982) is an American classical cellist. She was named a 2011 MacArthur Fellow.

Life and career
Weilerstein was born in Rochester, New York. to a secular Jewish family.
She started playing the cello at age four. She made her debut at age 13 with the Cleveland Orchestra playing Tchaikovsky's Variations on a Rococo Theme. As a soloist she has performed with a number of other major orchestras on four continents. She also is active in chamber music and performs with her parents, violinist Donald Weilerstein (the founding first violinist of the Cleveland Quartet) and pianist Vivian Hornik Weilerstein, as the Weilerstein Trio. The trio currently resides at the New England Conservatory in Boston. Her brother is the violinist and conductor Joshua Weilerstein (born in 1987). She is married to Venezuelan conductor Rafael Payare.

Weilerstein has received a number of honors. In 2000–2001 she won an Avery Fisher Career Grant and was selected to play in the ECHO "Rising Stars" program and Chamber Music Society II, the young artists' program of the Chamber Music Society of Lincoln Center. In 2004 she graduated from Columbia University in New York City with a BA in Russian history. In 2006 she was awarded the Leonard Bernstein Prize at the Schleswig-Holstein Music Festival. In 2011 she received a MacArthur Foundation "genius grant".

A champion of contemporary music, Weilerstein has worked extensively with composers Osvaldo Golijov, Lera Auerbach and Joseph Hallman. She performed the New York premiere of Golijov's Cello Concerto "Azul" at Lincoln Center's Mostly Mozart Festival, the world premiere of Auerbach's 24 Preludes for Cello and Piano at the Caramoor International Music Festival, Auerbach's transcription of Shostakovich Op. 34 for Cello and Piano at the Schleswig-Holstein Musik Festival, and Hallman's Cello Concerto with the Saint Petersburg Philharmonic Orchestra.

In May 2016, she premièred Outscape, Pascal Dusapin's second cello concerto, with the Chicago Symphony Orchestra, to positive critical reception.

In March 2017 at Symphony Hall, she performed the world premiere of Matthias Pintscher's concerto for cello and orchestra "un despertar" with the Boston Symphony Orchestra to critical acclaim. She plays a 1790 William Forster cello.

Discography

 Beethoven Cello Sonatas, PENTATONE, PTC 5186884 (2022)
 Bach Cello Suites, PENTATONE, PTC 5186751 (2020)
 Old Souls – Chamber Music for Flute and Strings with Gili Schwarzman, Guy Braunstein, Amihai Grosz, Susanna Yoko Henkel (Antonín Dvořák, Ludwig van Beethoven, Hugo Wolf, Fritz Kreisler) PENTATONE PTC 5186815 (2019)
Transfigured Night: Haydn & Schönberg. Alisa Weilerstein, Trondheim Soloists. PENTATONE PTC 5186717 (2018).
Alisa Weilerstein & Vivian Hornik Weilerstein: Works for Cello and Piano (recording in the EMI Classics "Debut" Series) (EMI 5 73498 2)
 The Weilerstein Trio, with Donald Weilerstein (violin), Alisa Weilerstein (cello) and Vivian Hornik Weilerstein (piano): Dvořák Trios (recording from Koch International Classics) (Koch B000CC4W14)
 Joseph Hallman: Cello Concerto (St. Petersburg) (live recording of premiere performance): Alisa Weilerstein (cello) and the St. Petersburg (Russia) Chamber Philharmonic, Jeffery Meyer, conductor and Artistic Director (jhallmanmusic 884502022742).
 Alisa Weilerstein, Czech Philharmonic Orchestra, Jiri Belohlavek (Cond.): Dvořák Cello Concerto (Decca 0289 478 5705)
 Alisa Weilerstein, Staatskapelle Berlin, Daniel Barenboim (Cond): Edward Elgar Cello Concerto op. 85, Elliott Carter Cello Concerto, Max Bruch Kol Nidrei op. 47 (Decca 0289 478 2735)
 Alisa Weilerstein Solo: Zoltán Kodály Sonata op. 8, Osvaldo Golijov Omaramor, Gaspar Cassadó Suite per violoncello, Bright Sheng Seven Tunes Heard in China (Decca 0289 478 5296)

Media

References

External links

Hear Alisa Weilerstein in concert from WGBH Boston
Cellist Alisa Weilerstein Wins Leonard Bernstein Prize

1982 births
Living people
Musicians from Rochester, New York
American classical cellists
American women classical cellists
MacArthur Fellows
Columbia College (New York) alumni
Cleveland Institute of Music alumni
21st-century American women musicians
Articles containing video clips
21st-century cellists